The Opium Den (Italian: Fumeria d'oppio) is a 1947 Italian crime film directed by Raffaello Matarazzo and starring Emilio Ghione Jr., Mariella Lotti, and Emilio Cigoli. It was an unsuccessful attempt to revive the Za La Mort character, who had been a popular figure during the silent era. Ghione jr. was the son of the actor Emilio Ghione who had originally played the role.

Cast

References

Bibliography 
 Moliterno, Gino. The A to Z of Italian Cinema. Scarecrow Press, 2009.

External links 
 

1947 films
Italian crime films
1947 crime films
1940s Italian-language films
Films directed by Raffaello Matarazzo
Italian black-and-white films
Films about opium
1940s Italian films